Matthew James Anthony Tootle (born 11 October 1990) is an English professional footballer who plays as a defender for  side Boston United.

Career

Crewe Alexandra
Tootle was born in Widnes, Cheshire. Joining Crewe as an eight-year old, Tootle signed his first professional contract after making an impression on Crewe manager Gudjon Thordarsson in July 2009.

He made his full debut on 21 November for Crewe Alexandra in a 2–2 draw, away at Northampton Town in League Two, playing the full 90 minutes. Tootle became a regular in the first team after Dario Gradi took over for his third spell as Crewe manager. His first goal in senior football came in Crewe's 2–2 draw with Rochdale on Boxing Day 2009.

Tootle appeared in the 2012 Football League Two play-off Final at Wembley, as Crewe beat Cheltenham Town 2–0 to win promotion to League One after three seasons in League Two. Less than a year later, Tootle became a winner at Wembley for the second time, playing the whole match as Crewe defeated Southend 2–0 in the 2013 Football League Trophy Final.

As Crewe battled against relegation in the 2013–14 season, Tootle replaced teammate Abdul Osman as captain of the side in March 2014. Crewe stayed up following a final-day win over Preston North End, and following Osman's departure it was decided he would continue in this role for the 2014–15 season.

Despite not featuring since October 2014 due to injury and illness, Crewe offered Tootle a contract extension at the end of the season.

Shrewsbury Town
Tootle moved to Shrewsbury Town on a free transfer, signing a two-year contract on 16 June 2015. He made his debut on the opening day of the 2015–16 season against Millwall, and scored his first goal for the club in a League Cup second-round tie against Crystal Palace, but he did not feature again at first-team level following a defeat at Port Vale on 31 October. He was released from his contract one year early by mutual consent in June 2016.

Notts County
On the same day that he left Shrewsbury Town, Tootle joined League Two side Notts County on a two-year contract.

He signed a new contract with Notts County at the end of the 2017–18 season.

At the end of the 2019–20 season, Tootle was released by the club.

Boston United
On 25 August 2020, Tootle signed for National League North side Boston United.

Style of play
Matt Tootle is a tenacious full back being comfortable on either the left or right back positions. He can also play as a winger. He's often praised for his work rate, athleticism, pace, stamina and adaptability which all make him an integral part for most teams.

Career statistics

Honours
Crewe Alexandra
Football League Two play-offs: 2012
Football League Trophy: 2012–13

Individual
Crewe Alexandra Player of the Year: 2013–14

References

External links
Crewe Alexandra profile

1990 births
Living people
Association football defenders
Boston United F.C. players
Crewe Alexandra F.C. players
English Football League players
English footballers
Footballers from Widnes
Notts County F.C. players
Shrewsbury Town F.C. players